Franco Martin Hita González (born 26 October 1978, in Mendoza) is a retired Argentine naturalized Chilean footballer who played as a striker.

Personal life
Hita is the son of the former Argentine footballer Alberto Hita and naturalized Chilean.

Honours

Club
Santiago Wanderers
 Primera División de Chile (1): 2001

Arema Malang
 Piala Indonesia (1): 2005

References

External links
 
 
 Franco Hita at MemoriaWanderers.cl

1978 births
Living people
Sportspeople from Mendoza, Argentina
Argentine footballers
Argentine expatriate footballers
Argentine emigrants to Chile
Naturalized citizens of Chile
Chilean footballers
San Luis de Quillota footballers
Santiago Wanderers footballers
Provincial Osorno footballers
Unión La Calera footballers
Gimnasia y Esgrima de Mendoza footballers
Persigo Gorontalo players
Persiter Ternate players
Persita Tangerang players
Arema F.C. players
Persema Malang players
Santiago Morning footballers
Unión San Felipe footballers
Mitra Kukar players
Persela Lamongan players
Franco Hita
General Paz Juniors footballers
Association football forwards
Tercera División de Chile players
Primera B de Chile players
Chilean Primera División players
Torneo Argentino A players
Indonesian Premier League players
Liga 1 (Indonesia) players
Liga 2 (Indonesia) players
Franco Hita
Torneo Argentino B players
Argentine expatriate sportspeople in Chile
Argentine expatriate sportspeople in Indonesia
Chilean expatriate sportspeople in Indonesia
Argentine expatriate sportspeople in Thailand
Chilean expatriate sportspeople in Thailand
Expatriate footballers in Chile
Expatriate footballers in Indonesia
Expatriate footballers in Thailand